Morazzone is a comune (municipality) of c. 4,000 inhabitants in the province of Varese in the Italian region Lombardy, located about  northwest of Milan and about  south of Varese. It is served by Gazzada-Schianno-Morazzone railway station.

Morazzone borders the following municipalities: Brunello, Caronno Varesino, Castiglione Olona, Castronno, Gazzada Schianno, Gornate-Olona, Lozza.

Sister towns
 Wimblington, England, United Kingdom (2007);
 Békésszentandrás, Hungary (2016).

Demographic evolution

References

External links
 Official website

Cities and towns in Lombardy